The 1814 United States elections occurred in the middle of Democratic-Republican President James Madison's second term, during the First Party System. Members of the 14th United States Congress were chosen in this election. During the 14th Congress, Indiana joined the union. The election took place during the War of 1812. 

Democratic-Republicans continued to dominate both houses of Congress, and slightly increased their majority in the House. Federalists picked up a small number of seats in the Senate.

See also
1814–15 United States House of Representatives elections
1814–15 United States Senate elections

References

1814 elections in the United States
1814
United States midterm elections